The Angola swallow (Hirundo angolensis) is a species of swallow that is native to the Afrotropics.

Description
They measure 15 cm and weigh 16 to 19 g. The plumage of the forehead, throat and upper breast is coloured deep rufous-chestnut. The crown and upperparts are a shiny steel-blue. Flight and tail feathers are black, the latter with large white windows.

Behaviour
They frequent a variety of open habitats up to the fringes of forest, whether altered by man or natural. Their diet consists of a variety of flying insects. They may forage alone or in flocks, and emit a weak twittering. Their breeding season and abundance depends much on their region of residence, and a few undertake migrations.

Range
It is found in Angola, Burundi, Democratic Republic of the Congo, Gabon, Kenya, Malawi, Namibia, Rwanda, Tanzania, Uganda, and Zambia.

Relationships
It has been considered conspecific with the Red-chested swallow, but is generally taken as a full species in a species complex that includes Barn, Red-chested, Pacific, Welcome, White-throated and Ethiopian swallows.

Subspecies
There are two subspecies, but intermediate forms occur:
 H. a. angolensis – type from Huíla Province, Angola
 H. a. arcticincta Sharpe, 1891 – East Africa

Gallery

References

Angolan swallow
Birds of Central Africa
Angolan swallow
Taxonomy articles created by Polbot